The 2018 Zippo 200 at The Glen was the 20th stock car race of the 2018 NASCAR Xfinity Series season, and the 24th iteration of the event. The race was held on Saturday, August 4, 2018, in Watkins Glen, New York at Watkins Glen International, a 2.45-mile (3.94 km) permanent road course. The race took the scheduled 82 laps to complete. At race's end, Joey Logano of Team Penske would dominate the race to win his 30th career NASCAR Xfinity Series win and his second and final win of the season. To fill out the podium, A. J. Allmendinger of GMS Racing and Justin Allgaier of JR Motorsports would finish second and third, respectively.

Background 

Watkins Glen International (nicknamed "The Glen") is an automobile race track located in Watkins Glen, New York at the southern tip of Seneca Lake. It was long known around the world as the home of the Formula One United States Grand Prix, which it hosted for twenty consecutive years (1961–1980), but the site has been home to road racing of nearly every class, including the World Sportscar Championship, Trans-Am, Can-Am, NASCAR Sprint Cup Series, the International Motor Sports Association and the IndyCar Series.

Initially, public roads in the village were used for the race course. In 1956 a permanent circuit for the race was built. In 1968 the race was extended to six hours, becoming the 6 Hours of Watkins Glen. The circuit's current layout has more or less been the same since 1971, although a chicane was installed at the uphill Esses in 1975 to slow cars through these corners, where there was a fatality during practice at the 1973 United States Grand Prix. The chicane was removed in 1985, but another chicane called the "Inner Loop" was installed in 1992 after J.D. McDuffie's fatal accident during the previous year's NASCAR Winston Cup event.

The circuit is known as the Mecca of North American road racing and is a very popular venue among fans and drivers. The facility is currently owned by International Speedway Corporation.

Entry list 

*Withdrew.

Practice

First practice 
The first practice session would occur on Friday, August 3, at 12:35 PM EST and would last for 50 minutes. Heavy rain pelted the session, leaving only six teams making a lap as most felt that it wasn't worth the risk.

Second and final practice 
The second practice session would occur on Friday, August 3, at 2:05 PM EST and would last for one hour and 20 minutes. Once again, rain would majorly affect the session, leaving many teams not making a lap.

Qualifying 
Qualifying would occur on Saturday, August 4, at 11:35 AM EST. Since the Watkins Glen International is a road course, the qualifying system was a multi-car system that included two rounds. The first round was 25 minutes, where every driver would be able to set a lap within the 25 minutes. Then, the second round would consist of the fastest 12 cars in Round 1, and drivers would have 10 minutes to set a lap. Whoever set the fastest time in Round 2 would win the pole.

One driver would fail to qualify: Stephen Leicht.

Full qualifying results

Race results 
Stage 1 Laps: 20

Stage 2 Laps: 20

Stage 3 Laps: 42

References 

2018 NASCAR Xfinity Series
NASCAR races at Watkins Glen International
August 2018 sports events in the United States
2018 in sports in New York (state)